Attenuizomus is a genus of hubbardiid short-tailed whipscorpions, first described by Mark Harvey in 2000.

Species 
, the World Schizomida Catalog accepts the following four species:

 Attenuizomus baroalba Harvey, 2000 – Australia (Northern Territory)
 Attenuizomus cuttacutta Harvey, 2000 – Australia (Northern Territory)
 Attenuizomus mainae (Harvey, 1992) – Australia (Northern Territory)
 Attenuizomus radon (Harvey, 1992) – Australia (Northern Territory)

References 

Schizomida genera